Vítor Tiago de Freitas Fernandes (born 11 February 1986), commonly known as Vitinha, is a Portuguese footballer who plays as a left back for Romanian club Metalurgistul Cugir.

He spent his entire professional career in Romania and Bulgaria, mainly at the service of Ludogorets in the latter case.

Club career
Born in São Torcato, Guimarães, Vitinha only played lower league football in his homeland. In January 2007 he signed with Romanian club CFR Cluj, and in the ensuing summer he started a series of loans in the latter country, representing in quick succession CS Otopeni (two spells), FC Unirea Alba Iulia and CS Concordia Chiajna; he appeared for all the teams in Liga I, scoring two goals in a combined 44 matches.

In the 2012 winter transfer window, Vitinha joined PFC Ludogorets Razgrad in the First Professional Football League (Bulgaria). He made his competitive debut on 3 March, coming on as a late substitute in a 3–0 home win against PFC Beroe Stara Zagora.

Vitinha was second-choice left-back as the Eagles won five consecutive national championships starting in 2012, mainly being understudy to veteran Yordan Minev. His maiden appearance in the UEFA Champions League took place on 6 August 2013, as he played five minutes in a 1–0 away win over FK Partizan for the third qualifying round.

On 16 June 2017, Vitinha signed with PFC Cherno More Varna also in the Bulgarian top division. He made his debut on 11 August in a 1–1 home draw against PFC Slavia Sofia, suffering an achilles tendon rupture in the beginning of the second half and going on to be sidelined for several months.

Vitinha returned to Romania subsequently, where he represented Unirea and CF Metalurgistul Cugir.

Club statistics

Honours
Ludogorets
First Professional Football League: 2011–12, 2012–13, 2013–14, 2014–15, 2015–16, 2016–17
Bulgarian Cup: 2011–12, 2013–14
Bulgarian Supercup: 2012, 2014

CSO Cugir
Liga III: 2020–21

References

External links

1986 births
Living people
Sportspeople from Guimarães
Portuguese footballers
Association football defenders
Segunda Divisão players
Vitória S.C. players
Liga I players
Liga II players
CFR Cluj players
CS Otopeni players
CSM Unirea Alba Iulia players
CS Concordia Chiajna players
First Professional Football League (Bulgaria) players
PFC Ludogorets Razgrad II players
PFC Ludogorets Razgrad players
PFC Cherno More Varna players
Portugal youth international footballers
Portuguese expatriate footballers
Expatriate footballers in Romania
Expatriate footballers in Bulgaria
Portuguese expatriate sportspeople in Romania
Portuguese expatriate sportspeople in Bulgaria